"Stoned to the Bone", titled "Stone to the Bone" in some releases, is a song written and recorded by James Brown. Released as a two-part single in 1973, it charted #4 R&B and #58 Pop. It also appeared on the album The Payback.

References

James Brown songs
Songs written by James Brown
1973 singles
1973 songs
Polydor Records singles